Below are the winners for the 2013 African-American film Critics Associations.

Winners

Best Picture:
1. 12 Years a Slave (Winner)
2. Lee Daniels' The Butler
3. Mandela: Long Walk to Freedom (film)
4. American Hustle
5. Gravity
6. Fruitvale Station
7. Dallas Buyers Club
8. Saving Mr. Banks
9. Out of the Furnace
10. 42

Special Achievement: Cheryl Boone Isaacs, Paris Barclay, Bob Weinstein, Harvey Weinstein, Zola Mashariki

References

African-American Film Critics Association Awards
2013 film awards